Cnopus is a genus of ant-like leaf beetles in the family Aderidae. There are at least four described species in Cnopus.

Species
These four species belong to the genus Cnopus:
 Cnopus impressus (LeConte, 1875)
 Cnopus kraxtepellenensis Alekseev & Grzymala, 2015
 Cnopus minor (Baudi di Selve, 1877)
 Cnopus nucleus (Fall, 1901)

References

Further reading

External links

 

Aderidae
Articles created by Qbugbot
Beetle genera